Corinth is an unincorporated community in Williamson County, Illinois, United States. It is located in the north side of Section 21, Township 8 South, Range 4 East of the Third Principal Meridian, at the crossroads of Corinth Road and Paulton/Thompsonville Roads.

History
Originally Roberts' Prairie and Roberts' Settlement. A post office was established 16 August 1864 and discontinued operations on 15 June 1911. The area is now served by the post office at Thompsonville, Illinois.

References

Unincorporated communities in Williamson County, Illinois
Unincorporated communities in Illinois
Populated places established in 1864